Rudrasena I may refer to:

 Rudrasena I (Saka king)
 Rudrasena I (Vakataka king)